Margaret Gillmer Kroehle Dennison (June 14, 1920 – September 17, 2010) was a former member of the Ohio House of Representatives.

External links
 Profile on the Ohio Ladies Gallery website

References

Democratic Party members of the Ohio House of Representatives
Women state legislators in Ohio
1920 births
2010 deaths
21st-century American women